Biotechnology and Bioengineering is a peer-reviewed scientific journal covering biochemical engineering science that was established in 1959. In 2009, the BioMedical & Life Sciences Division of the Special Libraries Association listed Biotechnology and Bioengineering as one of the 100 most influential journals in biology and medicine of the past century.

The journal focuses on applied fundamentals and application of engineering principles to biology-based problems. Initially, fermentation processes, as well as mixing phenomena and aeration with an emphasis on agricultural or food science applications were the major focus. The scale up of antibiotics from fermentation processes was also an active topic of publication.

Biotechnology and Bioengineering publishes Perspectives, Articles, Reviews, Mini-Reviews, and Communications to the Editor that embrace all aspects of biotechnology. In addition to regular submissions, the journal publishes Viewpoints and Virtual Issues on selected research topics such as Bioenergy, Biofuels, Metabolic Engineering, Synthetic Biology, and others.

Elmer Gaden, Jr. was editor-in-chief of the journal from its initial publication until 1983. Daniel I.C. Wang and Eleftherios T. Papoutsakis each subsequently held this position. Douglas S. Clark, the current editor-in-chief, has served in this capacity since 1996.

This journal was formerly known as Journal of Biochemical and Microbiological Technology and Engineering (J. Biochem. Microbiol. Technol. It adopted its current title in 1962.

According to the Journal Citation Reports, the journal has a 2020 impact factor of 4.530.

References

External links
 

Biotechnology journals
Biomedical engineering journals
Wiley (publisher) academic journals
English-language journals
Publications established in 1959
Monthly journals